Miller's long-tongued bat (Glossophaga longirostris) is a bat species found in northern Brazil, Venezuela, Colombia, Guyana, Trinidad and Tobago, Grenada, the Netherlands Antilles and the U.S. Virgin Islands.

References

Bats of South America
Bats of Brazil
Mammals of Colombia
Glossophaga
Mammals described in 1898
Taxa named by Gerrit Smith Miller Jr.